Nagalassery  is a village and gram panchayat in Palakkad district in the state of Kerala, India.

Demographics
 India census, Nagalassery had a population of 26,115 with 12,443 males and 13,672 females.

References

Villages in Palakkad district
Gram panchayats in Palakkad district